"Close to You / Crazy Life (Yunho from 東方神起)" is Tohoshinki's 20th Japanese single, released on March 5, 2008. The single is the fourth installment of the song "Trick" in the album T.

Track listing

CD
 "Close to You"
 "Crazy Life" (Yunho from 東方神起)
 "Close to You" (Less Vocal)
 "Crazy Life" (Less Vocal) (Yunho from 東方神起)

Release history

Chart rankings and sales

Oricon sales charts (Japan)

Korea Top 20 foreign albums & singles

References

External links
 https://web.archive.org/web/20080409203505/http://toho-jp.net/index.html

2008 singles
TVXQ songs
2008 songs
Avex Trax singles
Rhythm Zone singles
Song articles with missing songwriters